Frédéric Vaysse-Knitter (born in 1975 in Albi) is a French classical pianist of Polish origin.

He entered the Conservatoire de Paris at the age of thirteen where he followed the teachings of Ventsislav Yankov and Michel Béroff.

Vaysse-Knitter distinguished himself in 2006 at the Paris Opéra in John Neumeier's La Dame aux Camélias.

His last recording, the record-book Monsieur Satie, l’homme qui avait un petit piano dans la tête, text by Carl Norac, read by François Morel and illustrated by Élodie Nouhen, was rewarded with a Grand Prix of the Académie Charles-Cros in 2006.

References

External links 
 Official website
 Frédéric Vaysse-Knitter (Le Piano Bleu)
 Biography
 Interview (ResMusica)
 CHOPIN - Ballade n°1 - Frédéric Vaysse Knitter (YouTube)

21st-century French male classical pianists
1975 births
Living people
People from Albi
Conservatoire de Paris alumni